Kellokosken Alku (abbreviated KelA) is a sports club from Kellokoski, Finland. The club was formed in 1926 as Woimistelu and Urheiluseura Alku.  It has specialised in athletics, skiing, gymnastics, wrestling, boxing, pesäpallo, cycling, football, volleyball, basketball, bandy, table tennis, swimming, orienteering, weight lifting, ice hockey, and floorball. Football and ice hockey are the two most popular sports. The men's football team currently plays in the Vitonen (Fifth Division) and their home ground is at the Kellokosken nurmi. The ice hockey team plays in the Second Division South, the fourth tier of Finnish ice-hockey. The Club chairman is Kyösti Lehtonen.

Background
KelA has spent many seasons in the lower divisions of the Finnish football league with occasional spells in the fourth tier, the Kolmonen (Third Division).

The club is able to make use of the indoor facilities at the Fortum-halli in Järvenpää.

Season to season

Club structure
Kellokosken Alku runs a number of teams including 1 men's team, 3 men's veterans teams, and 6 boys teams.  The club also runs a football school for young boys and girls.

2010 season
KelA are competing in Section 4 (Lohko 4) of the Vitonen administered by the Uusimaa SPL.  This is the senary highest tier in the Finnish football system.  In 2009 KelA finished in 7th place in Section 4 of the Vitonen.

References and sources
Official Website
Finnish Wikipedia
Suomen Cup
Kellokosken Alku Facebook

Footnotes

Football clubs in Finland
Tuusula
1926 establishments in Finland
Association football clubs established in 1926
Bandy clubs established in 1926
Ice hockey clubs established in 1926